Sar Kuraki or Sarkuraki may refer to:
 Sar Kuraki-ye Deli Rich-e Olya
 Sarkuraki-ye Sefidar